Ivor Ganahl (born 25 December 1942) is a Swiss sailor. He competed in the Finn event at the 1980 Summer Olympics.

References

External links
 

1942 births
Living people
Swiss male sailors (sport)
Olympic sailors of Switzerland
Sailors at the 1980 Summer Olympics – Finn
Place of birth missing (living people)
20th-century Swiss people